The 2010–11 Biathlon World Cup – Relay Women will start at Saturday December 11, 2010 in Hochfilzen and will finish Sunday March 13, 2011 in Khanty-Mansiysk at Biathlon World Championships 2011 event. Defending titlist is Russian team.

Competition format
The relay teams consist of four biathletes, who each ski , each leg skied over three laps, with two shooting rounds; one prone, one standing.

For every round of five targets there are eight bullets available, though the last three can only be single-loaded manually one at a time from spare round holders or bullets deposited by the competitor into trays or onto the mat at the firing line.

If after eight bullets there are still misses, one 150 m penalty loop must be taken for each missed target remaining. The first-leg participants start all at the same time, and as in cross-country skiing relays, every athlete of a team must touch the team's next-leg participant to perform a valid changeover.

On the first shooting stage of the first leg, the participant must shoot in the lane corresponding to their bib number (Bib #10 shoots at lane #10 regardless of position in race.), then for the remainder of the relay, the relay team shoots at the lane in the position they arrived (Arrive at the range in 5th place, you shoot at lane five.).

2009–10 Top 3 Standings

Medal winners

Standings

References

- Relay Women, 2010-11 Biathlon World Cup